Surendranath Kar (5 March 1892– 2 August 1970) was an Indian artist and architect, known for amalgamating the Indian architectural style with western and eastern styles of architecture. Born in 1892 in British India, Kar did his primary learning of art under renowned Bengali painter, Nandalal Bose and Abanindranath Tagore, the nephew of Nobel Laureate, Rabindranath Tagore. Later, he joined Vichitra Club, founded by the Tagore family, as a teacher of art. In 1917, when Tagore set up Brahmacharyasrama, the precursor of later day Shantiniketan, he joined the institution and worked as an art teacher. Two years later, he moved to Kala Bhavana of Tagore as a faculty member.

Kar, who was a companion of Tagore in many of his overseas visits, used the exposure he received to western and eastern architecture, to evolve his own style and, later, designed many buildings for Shantiniketan. 

He also designed the assembly hall for Rajghat Besant School (then under J. Krishnamurti and now run by Krishnamurti Foundation) in Varanasi, besides the Ganges, after being sent by Tagore upon special request.

The Government of India honoured him in 1959, with the award of Padma Shri, the fourth highest Indian civilian award for him services to the nation.

Surendranath Kar died in 1970 at the age of 78.

See also

 Shantiniketan
 Kala Bhavana
 Nandalal Bose 
 Abanindranath Tagore

References

Further reading
 
 

Recipients of the Padma Shri in science & engineering
1892 births
1970 deaths
Painters from Bihar
Bengali male artists
20th-century Indian painters
Indian male painters
20th-century Indian architects
20th-century Indian male artists